Harold Edward "Howl" Darragh (September 13, 1902 – April 28, 1993) was a Canadian ice hockey right winger who played eight seasons in the National Hockey League for the Pittsburgh Pirates, Philadelphia Quakers, Boston Bruins and Toronto Maple Leafs between 1925 and 1933. He was born in Ottawa, Ontario. He won his only Stanley Cup in 1932 with the Toronto Maple Leafs.

Harold was a younger brother of the NHL player Jack Darragh.

He was the last surviving former player of the Pittsburgh Pirates. He is buried at Beechwood Cemetery in Ottawa.

Career statistics

Regular season and playoffs

Awards and achievements
 1932 Stanley Cup Champion  (Toronto)

References

External links

1902 births
1993 deaths
Boston Bruins players
Canadian ice hockey right wingers
Ice hockey people from Ottawa
Philadelphia Quakers (NHL) players
Pittsburgh Pirates (NHL) players
Pittsburgh Yellow Jackets (USAHA) players
Stanley Cup champions
Syracuse Stars (IHL) players
Toronto Maple Leafs players